Ricardo Marín (born 28 April 1968) is a Spanish handball player. He competed at the 1988 Summer Olympics and the 1992 Summer Olympics.

References

1968 births
Living people
Spanish male handball players
Olympic handball players of Spain
Handball players at the 1988 Summer Olympics
Handball players at the 1992 Summer Olympics
Sportspeople from Valencia